Palmer River may refer to:
 Palmer River (Massachusetts – Rhode Island), in the United States
 Palmer River (Northern Territory), Australia, a tributary of the Finke River
 Palmer River (Queensland), in Australia
 Palmer River (Bécancour River tributary), a tributary of Bécancour River, in Chaudières-Appalaches, Quebec, Canada
 Palmer River (Labrador), a river flowing through the Torngat Mountains into Nachvak fjord

See also
 Palmer (disambiguation)